Her Unwilling Husband is a 1920 American silent comedy film directed by Paul Scardon and starring Blanche Sweet, Alan Roscoe, and Edwin Stevens.

Cast
 Blanche Sweet as Mavis
 Alan Roscoe as Homer Owen 
 Edwin Stevens as John Jordan

References

Bibliography
 Donald W. McCaffrey & Christopher P. Jacobs. Guide to the Silent Years of American Cinema. Greenwood Publishing, 1999.

External links
 

1920 films
1920 comedy films
1920s English-language films
American silent feature films
Silent American comedy films
Pathé Exchange films
American black-and-white films
Films directed by Paul Scardon
1920s American films